Hopscotch Lollipop Sunday Surprise is a studio album by The Frogs, released in 2001. Although brushing on satirical homoerotic and religious themes, the album chiefly consists of serious love songs. musically, the album features heavy electric guitars, acoustic guitars and industrial/electronic beats mixed together. There is also a cover of Bob Dylan's 1973 song, "Billy 1". Hopscotch is considerably better-produced than most of the Frogs' material, which can sometimes be no more than home recordings. Scratchie Records released the album in early 2001, but cut further distribution after weak initial sales, much to the band's disgust.

Track listing
 "Whisper"
 "Sleep on the Street"
 "The Longing Goes Away"
 "Bad Daddy"
 "Bear"
 "Jewels"
 "Better than God"
 "Know It All"
 "Nipple Clamps"
 "Bad Mommy"
 "Billy" (Bob Dylan)
 "Fuck Off"
 "Enter I"

2022 Edition
On May 8, 2022, Jimmy Flemion announced the release of Hopscotch Lollipop Sundae Surprise (Alternate 2022 Edition), which contains new mixes and versions of the original album.

Personnel
 Jimmy Flemion - Guitar, Bass, Vocals
 Dennis Flemion - Drums, Keyboards, Samples, Vocals
 Billy Corgan - Additional Guitar, Keyboards & Samples

Additional production
 Billy Corgan aka Johnny Goat ("The Longing Goes Away")
 Chuck E. Myers ("Better Than God")
 Bjorn Thorsrud (engineering, mixing & editing)
 John Hiler (engineering & mixing)

See also
Pat Garrett & Billy the Kid (1973)

Notes

External links
Lyrics

2001 albums
The Frogs (band) albums